Cowal is a peninsula in Argyll and Bute, in the west of Scotland, that extends into the Firth of Clyde.

The northern part of the peninsula is covered by the Argyll Forest Park managed by Forestry and Land Scotland. The Arrochar Alps and Ardgoil peninsula in the north fringe the edges of the sea lochs whilst the forest park spreads out across the hillsides and mountain passes, making Cowal one of the remotest areas in the west of mainland Scotland. The Loch Lomond and The Trossachs National Park extends into Cowal. The peninsula is separated from Knapdale by Loch Fyne, and from Inverclyde and North Ayrshire to the east by the Firth of Clyde. Loch Long and its arm, Loch Goil are to the north-east. The south of the peninsula is split into three forks by Loch Striven and Loch Riddon (Loch Ruel). The Isle of Bute lies to the south separated by the narrow Kyles of Bute which connect the Firth of Clyde to Loch Riddon.

Cowal's only burgh is Dunoon in the south-east, from which ferries sail to Gourock in Inverclyde. Other ferries run from Portavadie in the west to Tarbert in Kintyre, and from Colintraive in the south to Rhubodach on the Isle of Bute.

Much of Cowal was once held by the Lamonts. Later, the Campbells came to be one of the most powerful families in Cowal.

Geography and geology

The Cowal peninsula is bounded by Loch Fyne on the west and Loch Long and the Firth of Clyde on the east. It is separated from the Isle of Bute by the deep narrow straits of the Kyles of Bute. The coastline is incised by deep sea lochs, principally Loch Riddon, and Loch Striven. These split the southern half of Cowal into three narrower peninsulas; on the west, the Kilfinan peninsula, and on the east, the Toward peninsula, which is also isolated from the north of Cowal, by the Holy Loch. The small central peninsula is divided from the Kilfinan peninsula by Loch Riddon, and the interjection of Bute, and its Kyles.

Cowal's underlying geology is made up largely of resistant metamorphic rocks, but south of the Highland Boundary Fault part of the Toward peninsula is composed of sedimentary rocks. The landscape is mountainous, the high ground dominated by moorland, peat mosses and the forest that often extends down the sides of the sea lochs to the water's edge. The acreage of improved farmland is small. Most land is owned by estates or the Forestry and Land Scotland except in the more settled areas.

The coast is mostly rocky and the few beaches are mostly shingle and gravel except on Loch Fyne: the longest sandy beach is at Ardentinny on Loch Long. The only lowland areas are around the coast where most of the settlement is found, particularly around Dunoon, Cowal's largest settlement on the Firth of Clyde. Other settlements include Innellan, Sandbank, Kilmun, Strone, Arrochar, Lochgoilhead, Tighnabruaich, Kames and Strachur.

Transport
 
The A83 trunk road crosses the northern end of the peninsular passing Arrochar at the head of Loch Long and Cairndow near the head of Loch Fyne. It partly follows or runs parallel to William Caulfield's historic military road that takes its name, Rest and Be Thankful from the stone seat erected at the summit at the head of Glen Croe. As the A83 has been subject to landslips, the old route has been used as a diversionary route. The other A roads are the A815 which links the A83 with Dunoon via Strachur where the A886 leaves it and heads south via Glendaruel to Colintraive where the ferry connects it to the Isle of Bute and the A8003 which links Tighnabruaich to the A886. Other roads are secondary B roads, narrow roads or tracks.

At Colintraive the Caledonian MacBrayne vehicle ferry takes five minutes to cross the  strait to Rhubodach on Bute. The ferry from Portavadie to Tarbert on Kintyre across Loch Fyne takes 25 minutes. A service operated by Caledonian MacBrayne connects Dunoon to Gourock in Inverclyde where there is easy access the ScotRail train service to Glasgow Central railway station.

History
Evidence of early occupation of the area is in the form of cairns or burial mounds. At the south end a cist contained the deposits of burnt bones from eight or ten bodies. A smaller cist in the centre contained a bowl, burnt bone, charcoal and flint chips, and in the clay below them, the remains of a burial. A third even smaller cist also contained a food bowl, burnt bones and flint chips. A whetstone, flint knife, fragments of pottery and a greenstone axe were also found.

Argyle (Argyll)

When the Irish invaded the region, it became part of their kingdom of Dal Riata. The Cenél Comgaill, a kin group within Dal Riata, controlled the Cowal peninsula, which consequently took their name (evolving over time from Comgaill to Cowal). Prior to this, little is known, except as revealed archaeologically, though the region may have been part of the Pictish kingdom of Fortriu.

Following a subsequent invasion by Norsemen, the Hebridean islands of Dal Riata became the Kingdom of the Isles, which following Norwegian unification became part of Norway, as Suðreyjar (historically anglicised as Sodor). The remaining parts of Dal Riata attracted the name Argyle (later Argyll), in reference to their ethnicity. In an unclear manner, the kingdom of Alba was founded elsewhere by groups originating from Argyll, and expanded to include Argyll itself.

However, an 11th-century Norse military campaign led to the formal transfer of Lorn, Islay, Kintyre, Knapdale, Bute, and Arran, to Suðreyjar. This left Alba with no part of Argyll except Cowal, and the land between Loch Awe and Loch Fyne. After Alba united with Moray, over the course of the century, it became Scotland. In 1326, a sheriff was appointed for the Scottish parts of Argyll.

Although, following the Treaty of Perth, Suðreyjar's successor state, the Lordship of the Isles, fell under the nominal authority of the Scottish king, it was not until 1475 that it was merged with Scotland (the occasion being the punishment of its ruler for an anti-Scottish conspiracy). The sheriffdom of Argyll was expanded to include the adjacent mainland areas from the Lordship. Following local government reforms in the 19th century, the traditional provinces were formally abolished, in favour of counties aligned with sheriffdoms, so Cowal became merely a part of the county of Argyll.

Clans and castles

The history of the Cowal is tied into the clans who inhabited it. Seemingly, in the 11th century, an unidentified heiress of the Cenel Comgaill married Anrothan, grandson of the king of the Cenél nEógain, from Ulster. Clan traditions argue that Anrothan's lands were passed down to a descendant named Aodha Alainn O'Neil, who had the following sons:
Neil, who founded the MacNeil of Argyll, who were castellans of Castle Sween in Knapdale, on behalf of the Lords of the Isles. The MacNeil of Barra claim to be related to them, though how they came to be involved with Barra is unclear.
Gillachrist, whose son was:
Lachlan Mor, who founded Clan MacLachlan, who ruled from Castle Lachlan, on the Loch Fyne coast
Dunslebhe, whose sons were:
Ewen, who founded Clan Ewen of Otter, who ruled from Castle MacEwen, in the Kilfinan peninsula
Fearchar, who founded Clan MacKerracher, renamed Clan Lamont after 1235, after Lauman, the then chief. Clan Lamont ruled from Toward Castle, in the Toward peninsula.

Excavations carried out at Castle MacEwen showed the site had several stages of development before it was the defended medieval homestead of the MacEwens; at first there was a palisaded enclosure, and then a promontory fort with a timber rampart.

The remote areas in the north east of Cowal, which were theoretically under the dominion of Clan Lamont, were used by Scottish kings for hunting; indeed, Cowal was the last part of Britain to have wild boar. When King John Balliol was threatened by his rival, Robert de Bruys, Balliol's ally, the king of England, established Henry Percy at Carrick Castle, in the region; likewise Dunoon Castle further south. De Bruys expelled the English from Cowal, with the aid of the Campbells (who were based nearby at Loch Awe), and eventually defeated Balliol. De Bruy's son gave Carrick Castle to the Campbells, while, after spending some time as a direct Royal possession, Dunoon Castle was handed to them by James III, who made the Campbells its Honorary Keepers.

During the civil war between Royalists and Puritans, the Campbells had sided with the Puritans, so following their defeat at the Battle of Inverlochy, Clan Lamont took the opportunity to push back the borders of Campbell control. Predictably, in 1646, the Campbells took revenge, and overran Toward Castle; after being offered hospitability, the Campbells slaughtered the Lamont occupants in their beds. Despite the chief of the Lamonts surrendering, the Campbells hanged many members of Clan Lamont, in what became known as the Dunoon massacre.

By contrast, the next chief of the Campbells, the son of the former chief, was a Royalist, so after the restoration of Royalist rule, the Campbells were not ultimately dispossessed of their gains. However, after James VII came to the Scottish throne, the Campbells revolted, and the chief was executed, but his son, the new chief, took part in the successful expulsion of James VII, so the Campbells once again ultimately retained their lands.

Military road
After the Jacobite rising of 1715 when James Francis Edward Stuart attempted to regain the throne, the lack of roads in the Highlands prevented the British army from advancing to quell areas of unrest. General Wade was tasked with implementing a programme to build military roads from north-central Scotland through the Highlands to the forts in the Great Glen. They were constructed by officers and soldiers. William Caulfeild succeeded Wade in 1740 and constructed the road from Dumbarton via Tarbet to Inveraray through the Cowal where it is known as the "Rest and Be Thankful".

Tourism
In Victorian times tourism began to take hold on the Clyde coast. Steam propulsion started in 1812 and by the end of the 19th century, paddle steamers ferried thousands of Glaswegians doon the watter from Broomielaw in the city centre to holiday resorts including Dunoon on the Cowal.

Sport and culture
The Loch Lomond and Cowal Way stretches for over  through Cowal, from Portavadie on the southeastern shore of Loch Fyne leading to Inveruglas on Loch Lomond, in the Loch Lomond and The Trossachs National Park.

The Cowal Highland Gathering, the annual highland games, are held annually in Dunoon stadium on the last Friday/Saturday of August.

Castles on Cowal

See also
 Cowal Community Hospital
 National parks of Scotland

References

Sources

External links

 
Peninsulas of Scotland
Firth of Clyde
Landforms of Argyll and Bute
Scottish coast
Scottish coast and countryside
Highlands and Islands of Scotland
Regions of Scotland